The 1940 Morris Brown Wolverines football team was an American football team that represented Morris Brown College in the Southern Intercollegiate Athletic Conference (SIAC) during the 1940 college football season. The Morris Brown team was recognized as the 1940 black college national champion.  

Key players included fullback John "Big Train" Moody and halfbacks "Switch Engine" Jenkins and Joe Mitchell. Moody and guard Willie Griffin, one of Morris Brown's "Gold Dust Twins," were selected by The Pittsburgh Courier as first-team players on its 1940 All-America team. Shepard was selected as a second-team guard, and Jenkins was selected as a third-team back.

Schedule

References

Morris Brown
Morris Brown Wolverines football seasons
Black college football national champions
Morris Brown Wolverines football